Krasnotorka is an urban-type settlement in Kramatorsk Raion in Donetsk Oblast of eastern Ukraine. Population:

Demographics
Native language as of the Ukrainian Census of 2001:
 Ukrainian 54.70%
 Russian 44.74%
 Belarusian and Armenian 0.22%

References

Urban-type settlements in Kramatorsk Raion